Pakal Nakshatrangal is a 2008 Indian Malayalam-language drama film directed by Rajeev Nath and written by Anoop Menon from a story by Nath. It was the debut screenplay of Menon. The film stars Mohanlal, Suresh Gopi, Murali, Kalpana, Anoop Menon, and Lakshmi Gopalaswamy. It is about the lives of a group of intellectuals in Kerala in the later half of the 1990s. The film was critically acclaimed.

Plot

Pakal Nakshatrangal tells the story of Siddharthan, narrated by Siddharthan's son Adi to his wife as the content of his new book. Siddharthan is a brilliant film maker but leads a Casanova lifestyle entwined with women, alcohol and drugs. His house 'Daffodils' is his salvation and the epicentre for art with his big bunch of friends.

One day Siddarthan is found dead at Daffodils. His untimely death is considered suspicious but eludes the police due to lack of evidence. Adi decides to dig into his father's past and solve the mystery surrounding his death. Adi converse with Siddharthan's friends, read his diary and articles, and get help from a psychic Dr. Vaidyanathan. The story revolves around what Adi finds out about his father's life and whether and how he finds out the truth about the mysterious death.

Cast
 Mohanlal as Sidharthan 
 Suresh Gopi as Dr. Vaidyanathan
 Anoop Menon as Adi Sidharthan
 Lakshmi Gopalaswamy as Adi's wife
 Manianpilla Raju as Tharakan
 Kalpana as Raji
 Reena Basheer as Dr. Usha
 K. B. Venu as Madhavan, Sidharthan's friend
 Nishanth Sagar as Thushar
 Murugan
 N. L. Balakrishnan
 Balachandran Chullikkadu
 Jagannathan
 Ganapathi as young Adi Sidharthan
 Sukumari

Awards
Mohanlal got the Kerala Film Critics Award and the Mathrubhumi Film Awards for Best Actor for this film.

References

External links
 

2008 films
2000s Malayalam-language films
Indian drama films
Films shot in Thiruvananthapuram
Films shot in Mumbai
Films with screenplays by Anoop Menon
Films scored by Shahabaz Aman
Films directed by Rajeevnath